Liberty Heights is a 1999 film by Barry Levinson.

Liberty Heights  may also refer to:

Liberty Heights, Lexington, a neighborhood in SE Lexington, Kentucky
 Liberty Heights, a neighborhood Lexington, Massachusetts
 Liberty Heights, Springfield, Massachusetts, a neighborhood
 Maryland Route 26, Liberty Heights Avenue in Baltimore, Maryland